The NASCAR Mikel's Truck Series (formerly known as the MasterCard Truck Series) was a Mexican pickup truck racing predecessor of Desafío Corona.

Drivers
NASCAR Corona Series drivers participated in the MasterCard Truck Series, including Jorge Goeters, Patrick Goeters, Marcelo Nuñez, César Tiberio Jiménez, Sebastián Ocaranza, Sebastián Ocaranza, Jr., Julio Bracho, Jr., José González, and Oscar Ruiz. In 2017 the series was revived as the NASCAR Mikel's Truck Series.

Manufacturers

In the 2002 season, only Chevrolet took part. In the 2003 season, Dodge was added to the category. In the 2017 revival inwards Ford was added as a manufacturer.

Races
21 races were held, all in ovals, with eight in 2002 and 13 in 2003. In 2002 and 2003, it ran in San Antonio, Texas, and an oval in the Estadio Azteca park lot was included. In the 2017 revival road courses became part of the schedule.

Champions

References

NASCAR Mexico Series
Pickup truck racing series